The qualification process for the 2017 Women's Rugby World Cup began on 14 February 2015. Twelve teams qualified for the tournament, which was held in Ireland in 2017.

Qualification process
Following the 2014 Women's Rugby World Cup, seven teams received an automatic qualification berth - these berths being given to the top seven teams (England, Canada, France, Ireland, New Zealand, the United States and Australia). The remaining five berths for the 2017 finals were awarded through regional tournaments.

The non-automatic qualification process began on 14 February 2015.

Regional qualification
There are 12 nations participating in the 2017 Women's Rugby World Cup. Seven teams have automatically qualified by virtue of their performance at the prior Rugby World Cup, leaving five teams to qualify through regional matches. Regional Qualification began on 14 February 2015, during the second round of the 2015 Women's Six Nations Championship.

Europe

European Qualification
England, France, and Ireland automatically qualified by virtue of their finishes in the 2014 tournament. In addition, there were three other places available for European countries.

Round One

The top two teams from the combined 2015 and 2016 Women's Six Nations Championship, Italy and Wales, qualified directly. The remaining team, Scotland, proceeded to Round Three.

Round Two

The top team from the 2016 Women's European Championship proceeded to Round Three. The tournament took place in Spain in October, 2016, with Spain being declared champions.

Round Three

Scotland and the winner of Round Two, Spain, played a home-and-away series to determine the final European qualifier. Spain won both games.

Asia and Oceania

Asian Qualification

The top two teams of the 2016 Asia Rugby Women's Championship qualified to the Repechage. The ARWC was contested between Japan and Hong Kong, Kazakhstan withdrew from the tournament.

Oceania Qualification

New Zealand and Australia automatically qualified due to their finishes in the 2014 tournament. A third team, Fiji, defeated Papua New Guinea 37–10 in the Oceania qualifier to move on to the repechage.

Repechage

The two best-ranked teams from a final qualifying tournament featuring one team from Oceania and two teams from Asia.

Sources

External links
. RWCWomens.com

2017 Women's Rugby World Cup
2016 in women's rugby union
2015 in women's rugby union